WCFW may refer to:

 WCFW (FM), a radio station (92.7 FM) licensed to serve Kewaunee, Wisconsin, United States
 WEZY (FM), a radio station (105.7 FM) licensed to serve Chippewa Falls, Wisconsin, which held the call sign WCFW from 1968 to 2022